WNLN-LP (107.3 FM) was a radio station licensed to serve Niantic, Connecticut. The station was last owned by New Haven Educational Radio Corp. It aired a Christian radio format.

The station was assigned the WNLN-LP call letters by the Federal Communications Commission on December 1, 2003.

Its license was cancelled on April 4, 2022 for failing to file a renewal application.

References

External links
WNLN-LP official website
 

NLN-LP
NLN-LP
2003 establishments in Connecticut
Radio stations established in 2003
Radio stations disestablished in 2022
2022 disestablishments in Connecticut
Defunct radio stations in the United States
Defunct religious radio stations in the United States
NLN-LP